Silver is the debut studio album by Canadian rock band Moist. The album cost approximately $4000 Canadian to make. It included the singles "Push", "Silver" and "Believe Me". The album reached #12 on The Record's Canadian Albums Chart. It is the band's most commercially successful album, being certified 4× Platinum in Canada.

Recording and release
In 1993, in an effort to get a record deal, the band decided to record a full-length album, which was done from December 26, 1993, to January 1, 1994; the album included five songs from Moist's 1993 independently released cassette. 
The album was titled Silver and released independently on February 8, 1994. It was distributed by EMI Music Publishing Canada, whom the band had signed with in 1993. 
By March 1994, the band signed with EMI Music Canada and the label relaunched the album in April.

Reception
Allmusic's James Chrispell gave the album a positive four star review, writing "Moist's music can be described as an aural equivalent to the great northern rain forests of British Columbia" and that "Dark, angry songs show the influence absorbed from places south of their border, namely Seattle, but Silver is no copy of anyone else's style."

Track listing

Singles
Push
Silver
Believe Me
Machine Punch Through
Freaky Be Beautiful (UK release)

Credits
David Usher - vocals
Jeff Pearce - bass guitar
Mark Makoway - guitar
Kevin Young - keyboard/piano
Paul Wilcox - drums
Produced by Moist and Kevin Hamilton

References

1994 debut albums
Moist (Canadian band) albums